The following tables provide a comparison of computer algebra systems (CAS). A CAS is a package comprising a set of algorithms for performing symbolic manipulations on algebraic objects, a language to implement them, and an environment in which to use the language. A CAS may include a user interface and graphics capability; and to be effective may require a large library of algorithms, efficient data structures and a fast kernel.

General

These computer algebra systems are sometimes combined with "front end" programs that provide a better user interface, such as the general-purpose GNU TeXmacs.

Functionality
Below is a summary of significantly developed symbolic functionality in each of the systems.

 via SymPy
<li> via qepcad optional package

Those which do not "edit equations" may have a GUI, plotting, ASCII graphic formulae and math font printing. The ability to generate plaintext files is also a sought-after feature because it allows a work to be understood by people who do not have a computer algebra system installed.

Operating system support
The software can run under their respective operating systems natively without emulation. Some systems must be compiled first using an appropriate compiler for the source language and target platform. For some platforms, only older releases of the software may be available.

Graphing calculators
Some graphing calculators have CAS features.

See also
 :Category:Computer algebra systems
 Comparison of numerical-analysis software
 Comparison of statistical packages
 List of information graphics software
 List of numerical-analysis software
 List of numerical libraries
 List of statistical software
 Mathematical software
 Web-based simulation

References

External links
 

 
Comparisons of mathematical software
Mathematics-related lists